Łapsze Niżne , is a village in Nowy Targ County, Lesser Poland Voivodeship, in southern Poland, close to the border with Slovakia. It is the seat of the gmina (administrative district) called Gmina Łapsze Niżne.

The village has a population of 1,400.

It is one of the 14 villages in the Polish part of the historical region of Spiš (Polish: Spisz). Łapsze Niżne (where Niżne means Lower, as it lays lower in the valley) is the older village from the sister settlement Łapsze Wyżne (where Wyżne means Upper). The local parish was first mentioned in 1274.

References

Villages in Nowy Targ County
Spiš
Kraków Voivodeship (1919–1939)